Jalan Istana (Perak State Route A136) is a major road in Royal Town of Kuala Kangsar, Perak, Malaysia.

List of junctions

Istana, Kuala Kangsar